Frank Nash Westcott (August 8, 1858 – 1915) was a reverend and writer. He was born in Syracuse, New York. He wrote two novels.

His father, Amos Westcott, was an influential professor, dentist, dental college founder, and politician who served as an alderman and mayor of Syracuse.

Frank N.Westcott became an ordained minister and served at the St. James Protestant Episcopal Church in Skaneateles, New York.

His brother Edward Noyes Westcott was a banker and writer who authored the popular novel David Harum. Published posthumously in 1899, months after his death, it is set in Central New York.

Struggling with sleeplessness, nervous trouble, and a broken arm, Frank Westcott committed suicide while in hospital in 1915.

Bibliography
The Heart of Catholicity
Dabney Todd
Hepsey Burke
Catholic Principles

Filmography
Down Home (1920), based on his novel Dabney Todd

References

External links

Writers from Syracuse, New York
1858 births
1915 suicides
19th-century American male writers
19th-century American novelists
Novelists from New York (state)
American male novelists
19th-century American Episcopalians
20th-century American Episcopalians
American Episcopal clergy
Suicides in Wisconsin